Gregory Rolle  (born 14 October 1959) is a former Bahamian athlete.

Rolle was a semi-finalist in the 400 metres hurdles at the 1984 Summer Olympics. He also won a bronze medal in the same event at the 1982 Commonwealth Games and was eighth at the 1987 Pan American Games.

His personal best of 49.46, set in Los Angeles in 1983, remained a national record for 30 years.

He now works as a director for the Bahamas Ministry of Tourism.

References

External links
Greg Rolle at Sports Reference

1959 births
Living people
Bahamian male hurdlers
Olympic athletes of the Bahamas
Athletes (track and field) at the 1984 Summer Olympics
Commonwealth Games bronze medallists for the Bahamas
Commonwealth Games medallists in athletics
Athletes (track and field) at the 1982 Commonwealth Games
Athletes (track and field) at the 1987 Pan American Games
Pan American Games competitors for the Bahamas
Central American and Caribbean Games medalists in athletics
Medallists at the 1982 Commonwealth Games